Motorway 4 (A4) is a partially completed motorway from Larissa to Trikala, connecting the A1 motorway with the under-construction A3 respectively. It is planned to carry the E92 and to be an upgrade of the existing Greek National Road 6 between those cities. As of Fall 2022, the only completed sections are Pineios river-Megalochori, the 4 km section between A1 near Nikaia and the beltway of Larissa.

References

Motorways in Greece
Roads in Thessaly